Flag of Nysa -  a town flag of the town of Nysa, Opole Voivodeship in Poland. The flag of Nysa is a bi-colour of yellow and red; where in the centre the flag has the town's Coat of Arms, featuring six white Fleur-de-lis lilies. The Fleur-de-lis are arranged in three rows: three on the top row; two in the middle; and one Fleur-de-lis lily on the bottom row - all in a white colour.

Coat of arms

The former Coat of Arms of Nysa originates from a seal from 1260, presenting a tower with a gate, with a crosier inside - a symbol of the Bishops of Wrocław; the symbol is no longer found on a seal from 1290. In 1306, the seal presented John the Baptist; a patron of Wrocław Cathedral Church, and the whole Archdiocese of Wrocław. The Saint, holding the Lamb of God, behind a perpendicular, Gothic building (possibly the Nysa Basilica); where by his feet, is the figure of a bishop, with a mitre and a crosier.

References

Brzeg County